Clavus rissoiniformis is a species of sea snail, a marine gastropod mollusk in the family Drilliidae.

Description

Distribution
This marine species occurs in the demersal zone off Hawaii.

References

 Kay, E. Alison. Hawaiian marine shells. Vol. 64. Bishop Museum Press, 1979.
 Tucker, J.K. (2004) Catalog of recent and fossil turrids (Mollusca: Gastropoda). Zootaxa 682:1–1295
 Severns M. (2011) Shells of the Hawaiian Islands - The Sea Shells. Conchbooks, Hackenheim. 564 pp

External links

rissoiniformis
Gastropods described in 1979